Mohamed Khalil (born 5 March 1939) is an Egyptian water polo player. He competed in the men's tournament at the 1964 Summer Olympics.

See also
 Egypt men's Olympic water polo team records and statistics
 List of men's Olympic water polo tournament goalkeepers

References

External links
 

1939 births
Living people
Egyptian male water polo players
Water polo goalkeepers
Olympic water polo players of Egypt
Water polo players at the 1964 Summer Olympics
Place of birth missing (living people)
20th-century Egyptian people